Four Days in November is a 1964 American documentary film directed by Mel Stuart about the assassination of John F. Kennedy. It was nominated for an Academy Award for Best Documentary Feature.

Summary
The film includes Dallas radio and television coverage of:
 The President's arrival at Love Field (Bob Walker, WFAA-TV 8)
 Progression of the motorcade (Bob Huffaker, KRLD Radio)
 First local bulletin of shooting (Jay Watson, WFAA-TV 8)
 Reports at Parkland Hospital (Bob Huffaker, KRLD Radio)
 Official announcement of President's death from Malcolm Kilduff (Roy Nichols, KLIF Radio)

Amateur films and photos include:
 Scenes along the motorcade route
 Orville Nix's films of the motorcade entering Dealey Plaza, the fatal head shot followed by Secret Service Agent Clint Hill climbing on top of the presidential limousine and the post-shooting confusion at the Plaza
 Mary Moorman's photo taken just a fraction of a second after the fatal shot
 Bob Jackson's photo of Jack Ruby shooting Lee Harvey Oswald at the Dallas City Jail

Production
The opening credits indicate that "certain scenes have been recreated in the original locations by the actual participants".  Some of these recreations include:
 Buell Wesley Frazier driving himself and Lee Harvey Oswald to work at the Texas School Book Depository on the morning of November 22.  This scene includes commentary from Frazier and his sister Linnie Mae Randle who saw Oswald arrive at their house and place a package (in which Oswald told Frazier it contained curtain rods but really had the murder weapon) in Frazier's car to take to work.
 Oswald's post-shooting trek from the Texas School Book Depository to the Texas Theater.  This segment includes commentary from cab driver William Whaley, who picked Oswald up and took him to his rooming house on North Beckley.
 Jack Ruby's path from his apartment to the Dallas City Jail on the morning of November 24

See also
 List of American films of 1964

References

External links
 
 
 
 
 Four Days in November at the website of David L. Wolper
 
 Rotten Tomatoes

1964 films
1964 documentary films
1964 directorial debut films
American documentary films
American black-and-white films
Black-and-white documentary films
Documentary films about the assassination of John F. Kennedy
1960s English-language films
Films directed by Mel Stuart
Films scored by Elmer Bernstein
United Artists films
1960s American films